Rafael Berrocal Buzac (born 24 August 1914 – 8 June 1969) was a Spanish footballer who played as a forward. He was best known for his stint with Sevilla in the 1940s.

Playing career
Berrocal was part of a renowned offensive line at Sevilla called the "Stuka", alongside Pepillo, Raimundo Blanco, Campanal I, and José López.

References

External links

1914 births
1969 deaths
Footballers from Seville
Spanish footballers
Association football forwards
Sevilla FC players
Xerez CD footballers
La Liga players
Segunda División players